Nguyễn Văn Vinh (born 15 December 1984) is a Vietnamese  footballer who plays as a midfielder.

Club career
Nguyễn played for Sông Lam Nghệ An between 2002 and 2007, having already represented Vietnam at the 2000 AFC U-17 Championship. He returned to SLNA in 2015, and began studying for his coaching qualifications.

Career statistics

Club

Notes

References

1984 births
Living people
Vietnamese footballers
Association football midfielders
V.League 1 players
Song Lam Nghe An FC players